Pacific Grade Summit, at elevation 2,454 m / 8,050 ft., is a high mountain pass on the western approach to Ebbetts Pass to the east in the Sierra Nevada range in eastern California.

California State Route 4, in the State Scenic Highway System, crosses the Sierra through the pass.

Mountain passes of the Sierra Nevada (United States)
Landforms of Alpine County, California